16α-Hydroxydehydroepiandrosterone sulfate (16α-OH-DHEA-S), also known as 16α-hydroxy-17-oxoandrost-5-en-3β-yl sulfate, is an endogenous, naturally occurring steroid and a metabolic intermediate in the production of estriol from dehydroepiandrosterone (DHEA) during pregnancy. It is the C3β sulfate ester of 16α-hydroxy-DHEA.

See also
 Pregnenolone sulfate
 Dehydroepiandrosterone sulfate
 15α-Hydroxy-DHEA sulfate
 16α-Hydroxyandrostenedione
 16α-Hydroxyestrone
 Estrone sulfate

References

Secondary alcohols
Androstanes
Steroid esters
Ketones
Steroid hormones
Sulfate esters